South Africa national field hockey team may refer to:
 South Africa men's national field hockey team
 South Africa women's national field hockey team